WT or Wt may refer to:

 Weight

People
 Watertender, a former petty officer rating in the United States Navy
 Weapons technician, a former petty officer rating in the United States Navy
 Robert Wight (1796–1872), in botanical taxonomy, abbreviated Wt

Places
 Washington Territory, a U.S. territory from 1853 to 1889

In martial arts
 Wing Tsun, a Chinese martial arts form
 World Taekwondo, the international federation governing the sport of taekwondo

In science
 wt%, percentage by weight, in chemistry
 Wild type (wt), in genetics, denoting a control or unaltered form
 Wilms' tumor, a cancer of the kidneys that typically occurs in children

In transportation
 Well tank, a type of locomotive
 Wasaya Airways (IATA airline code: WT; ICAO airline code WSG)
 Wates railway station, Special Region of Yogyakarta, Indonesia (station code: WT)
 UCI WorldTour, a cycling classification

In technology
 Wt (web toolkit), a web application framework for the C++ programming language
 WT Social, a microblogging and social networking service
 Wavelet transform, a time-frequency decomposition of a signal or function
 Wireless telegraphy or telephony, an early term for radio communications

On wikis
 Wikitravel, a collaborative travel guide project
 Wiktionary, a collaborative dictionary
 WikiTribune, online news website

Other uses
 The Washington Times, a daily newspaper in Washington, D.C.
 Tornado watch, encoded as WT in the US Emergency Alert System
 West Texas A&M University

 Working title, used in trade publications to indicate a preliminary title of a creative work.

See also

 
 
 TW (disambiguation)
 WT1 (disambiguation)